The Qatar Red Crescent Society (QRCS), the Qatari branch of the Red Crescent Society, was established in 1978. In 1981, it gained international recognition from the International Committee of the Red Cross in Geneva and joined the International Federation of Red Cross and Red Crescent Societies (IFRC). It is also a member of the Secretariat of Arab Red Crescent Societies in Jeddah. It became the first philanthropic organization in Qatar to establish a women's branch in 1982.

QRC is headquartered in Doha, but the organization works throughout the country. Their primary goal is to reduce detrimental effects of catastrophe and relieve suffering by contributing social and humanitarian services coinciding with the mission of its parent organization, the Red Crescent.

Activities

Domestic activities 
QRC was the first voluntary charity organization in Qatar. It is very active in aiding and developing relief programs for victims of disaster worldwide. Within Qatar, their programs include social development, training and qualification, awareness and education, programs and medical service, and advocacy community issues. Internationally QRC engages in relief and humanitarian activities, development and empowerment, and advocacy and humanitarian diplomacy.

During the conflict in the Gaza strip in fall 2014, the QRC helped, with Qatari government contributions, by providing medical supplies and fuel for hospitals.

International activities

Mali  
Qatar Red Crescent Society was the only humanitarian organization present in Northern Mali following the Islamist takeover. This presence raised questions over whether QRC was supporting the Islamists or helping local population. QRC's stated purpose of the mission was to "distribute food aid to 1,000 households and conduct an assessment of the population’s needs in water, sanitation, health and food security."

Gaza Strip  
In the September 2014 Gaza conflict, QRC was on the ground providing medical and ambulance services. They also donated several million Qatari Riyals to provide relief for Gaza.
On May 17, 2021, the offices run by QRC in Gaza were destroyed in an Israeli airstrike, as a result of ongoing confrontations.

Syria 
The QRC has also been active in Syria where it has engaged in ongoing humanitarian efforts to build roads in the Latakia Countryside and ensure secure transportation of those injured in the conflict to safer adjacent territories. They also launched a psychological support center in 2013 for refugees of the Syrian crisis.

Sudan 
In West Darfur, QRC has been instrumental in providing agricultural machinery to improve the livelihoods of local communities. QRC has had a representative office in West Darfur to oversee its projects there since 2009.

Partnerships 
The International Federation of Red Cross and Red Crescent Societies partnered with Qatar-based Al Jazeera Media Network in May 2014. This agreement built on relations developed over several years between QRC and Al Jazeera.  The goal of the agreement was to give a voice to the voiceless by drawing attention and support to the victims of disasters.

In coordination with QRC, the IFRC signed a partnership agreement in 2013 with Qatar's Cultural Village Foundation ("Katara") to help build more resilient and peaceful communities in the Middle East and North Africa.

In August 2012, QRC signed a partnership agreement with the Mali Red Cross to "ensure strong coordination in planning and implementing projects in Northern Mali".

Accusations of ties to extremism 
Operating in several areas of conflict, Qatar Red Crescent Society has been accused through blogs and think tank publications of supporting Islamist and terrorist groups. However it has always been cleared from these accusations of support to terrorism by the United Nations.

In June 2012 when Northern Mali was taken over by Islamists, Qatar Red Crescent was the only humanitarian organization that was granted access to the territory by the Islamists. In August 2014, the QRC raised more than $10 million at an event where the primary speaker was Hussam Badran, a Hamas leader who once supported bombing attacks in Tel Aviv. Qatar Red Crescent is not the only Qatari charitable organization accused of ties to extremism. Qatar Charity and the Sheikh Eid Bin Mohammad Al Thani Charity Association have also both been allegedly connected to terrorist groups, although the United Nations publicly rejected these assertions and subsequently co-organized in 2017 high-profile activities with these relief organizations. According to organizations like The United Nations and US Department of state, Qatar is the second largest contributor to the United Nations fund for counter terrorism out of the total 35 donors. This was revealed in the Fourth high level strategic dialogue with the united nation’s office of counter terrorism (UNOCT) during March 2022. Both parties (Qatar and UNOCT) discussed strategic priorities and collaboration for effective United Nations support to member’s state on counter terrorism.

It was also disclosed that in 2019, the Qatari government drafted new AML/CFT legislation, which finalized and passed into law in September and as of that year, there have been no terrorist activities in Qatar. The nation maintains an inter-agency of National anti-terrorism committee (NATC) which is composed of representatives from more than 10 government agencies says the country reports on terrorism 2019 by US Department of state.

None of the Qatari humanitarian organizations has ever been listed on the UN terror list established and maintained pursuant to Security Council res. 1267/1989/2253.

Organization 
The leadership of QRC includes the following individuals:
 Chairman of the Board/President: Dr. Mohammed Bin Ghanim A. Al-Ali Almaadid
 Secretary General: Saleh Ali Al-Muhanadi
 Acting Director of Finance and Investment: Mohamed Mohiy Khalifa
 Director of Human Resources and Admin Services: Nayef Faisal S. Almohannadi
 Director of Medical Affairs: Dr. Hassan Alyafi 
 Director of Organizational Development: Muhammad Mujahid
 Director of Public Communications Department: Rajaa Saleh
 Director of Resource Mobilization: Saad Shaheen Al-Kaabi
 Director of Social Development: Rashid Saad Almohanadi
 Head of International Relations: Fawzi Oussedik
 Head of Volunteering: Najat Abdrhman Al-Haidous

References

External links
Official website
Qatar Red Crescent Society - IFRC
Official Red Cross Web Site

Red Cross and Red Crescent national societies
Organizations established in 1978
1978 establishments in Qatar
Medical and health organisations based in Qatar